Ellen Stein may refer to:
Ellen Margrethe Stein, Danish actress
Jill Ellen Stein, American physician, activist, and political candidate

See also
Ellenstein, a surname